The Tripartellidae are an extinct family of fossil sea snails, marine gastropod molluscs in the clade Littorinimorpha.

According to the taxonomy of the Gastropoda by Bouchet & Rocroi (2005), the family Tripartellidae has no subfamilies.

Genera
Genera within the family Tripartellidae include:
 Tripartella Gründel 1998, the type genus

References 

 Paleobiology Database info on the type genus